Lingala is a village in the Khammam district, in the state of Telangana, India. It is located 6 km from its local Mandal at Kalluru

Demographics
There are approximately 1000 households in the village.

References

Villages in Khammam district